Ras-related protein Rap-1b, also known as GTP-binding protein smg p21B, is a protein that in humans is encoded by the RAP1B gene.

References

Further reading